A national liberation movement is an organization engaged in a war of national liberation.

National Liberation Movement may refer to:
Movement of National Liberation, a leftist party founded by former Mexican President Lázaro Cárdenas
National Liberation Movement (Albania), a communist World War II group
, a World War II group
National Liberation Movement (Ghana) a pre-independence group
National Liberation Movement (Guatemala), an anti-communist political party, close the Guatemalan military
National Liberation Movement (Panama), Panamanian political party
National Liberation Movement (Russia), Russian political movement
National Liberation Movement (Upper Volta), Banned political party in Burkina Faso
Basque National Liberation Movement 
Venetian National Liberation Movement
The Tupamaros, a Uruguayan left-wing militant group
The Yugoslav Partisans during World War II

See also
National Liberation Front (disambiguation)
National Liberation Party (disambiguation)